Lili Wilkinson (born 7 April 1981) is an Australian author. She has also written for several publications, including The Age, and managed insideadog.com.au, a website for teenagers about books, as part of her role at the Centre For Youth Literature at the State Library of Victoria until January 2011.

Early life
Wilkinson was born in Melbourne, the daughter of children's author, Carole Wilkinson, and film and television sound recordist, John Wilkinson. She attended Spensley Street Primary School and Mac.Robertson Girls' High School, and has referred to her high school self as "a bit of a nerd". Heavily involved in drama, in Year 7 she played Aphrodite in a musical version of The Odyssey.

Influences
Wilkinson has spoken of her love for the work of Diana Wynne Jones, David Almond and Lewis Carroll in interviews. She has also revealed that Shaun Tan is her favourite illustrator. She has been quoted as saying: "My favourite books would be Fire and Hemlock by Diana Wynne Jones and Through the Looking-Glass and What Alice Found There by Lewis Carroll. Oh, and Love That Dog by Sharon Creech. And The Last Samurai by Helen DeWitt. Do I have to stop there?"

Doctoral thesis 
In 2015, Wilkinson completed a PhD in Writing which examined the influence of young adult fiction on the politicisation of teenagers.

Works

Novels
Joan of Arc: The Story of Jehanne Darc (2006)
Scatterheart (2007)
The Not-Quite Perfect Boyfriend (2008)
Pink
Angel Fish (2009)
Pocketful of eyes (2011)
Love-shy (2012)
The Zigzag Effect (2013)
Green Valentine (2015)
The Boundless Sublime (2016)
That Christmas Feeling (2017)
After the Lights Go Out (2018)
The Erasure Initiative (2020)

Hodgepodge series 

 Hodgepodge: How to Make a Pet Monster 1 (2020)
 Flummox: How to Make a Pet Monster 2 (2021)

Anthologies
Short (editor) (2008)

Short Stories
"The Babysitter" in Trust Me (edited by Paul Collins) (2008)

Miscellaneous
"Fantastic Worlds" & "In Defense of Pink Books" in Right Book Right Time (Agnes Nieuwenhuizen) (2007)

Awards and recognition 

 2020 Aurealis Award for best children's fiction, shortlisted for Hodgepodge: How to Make a Pet Monster
2020 Aurealis Award for best young adult novel, shortlisted for The Erasure Initiative
2021 Griffith University Young Adult Book Award, Queensland Literary Awards, shortlisted for The Erasure Initiative

References

External links 

 Lili Wilkinson's homepage
 Lili Wilkinson's bio at Allen & Unwin
 Lili Wilkinson's bio at black dog books

1981 births
Living people
Australian writers of young adult literature
Australian women novelists
Women writers of young adult literature
People educated at Mac.Robertson Girls' High School
Writers from Melbourne